Bruce is a male given name.

Bruce may also refer to:

People
Bruce (actor), Taiwanese actor
Bruce (Russian nobility), Russian noble family of Scottish origin
Bruce (surname)
Clan Bruce, a Scottish clan
House of Bruce, a Scottish Royal house
 Robert the Bruce (1274–1329), King of Scotland

Places

Australia
 Bruce, Australian Capital Territory, a suburb of Canberra
 Bruce, South Australia, a town and locality
 Division of Bruce, an electoral division in Victoria

Canada
 Bruce, Alberta
 Bruce (Alberta provincial electoral district)
 Bruce County, Ontario
 Bruce (Ontario provincial electoral district)
 Bruce Nuclear Generating Station
 Bruce Island (Nunavut)
 Bruce Mountains, a mountain range on Baffin Island, Nunavut
 Bruce Trail, a hiking trail in Ontario

New Zealand
 Bruce (New Zealand electorate), a former parliamentary electorate
 Bruce statistical area, a census area and ward in the Clutha District

United States
 Bruce, Florida, a place in Florida
 Bruce, Minnesota
 Bruce, Mississippi
 Bruce, South Dakota
 Bruce, West Virginia
 Bruce, Wisconsin
 Bruce Creek (disambiguation), several creeks
 Bruce Township (disambiguation)

Elsewhere
 Bruce (crater), on the Moon
 Bruce Island, Russian Arctic

Arts, entertainment, and media
 "Bruce" (song), by Rick Springfield, 1984
 Bruce, a great white shark character in Finding Nemo
 Bruce, the nickname given to the shark in Jaws
 Bruce the Moose, a character in the television series Degrassi: The Next Generation
 The Bruce (film), a 1996 film about Robert the Bruce
 Bruce Publishing Company, an American Catholic publisher acquired by Benziger

Maritime
 Bruce (anchor), a type of anchor
 Bruce (ship), a 19th-century British sailing ship
 USS Bruce (DD-329), a US Navy destroyer

See also
 Bruce protocol, a diagnostic test used in the evaluation of cardiac function
 The Brus, a 14th-century narrative poem by John Barbour